Kenneth Alvin Smith (May 8, 1924 — September 23, 2000) was a Canadian ice hockey winger.

Career 
Smith played 331 games in the National Hockey League for the Boston Bruins between 1944 and 1951. The rest of his career, which lasted from 1944 to 1957, was primarily spent in the minor American Hockey League. His brother, Don, played 11 games with the New York Rangers in 1949–50.

Career statistics

Regular season and playoffs

External links
 

1924 births
2000 deaths
Boston Bruins players
Canadian ice hockey left wingers
Hershey Bears players
Ice hockey people from Saskatchewan
Oshawa Generals players
Pittsburgh Hornets players
Providence Reds players
Regina Pats players
Sportspeople from Moose Jaw